This is a list of songs recorded written and produced by Russ Ballard .

List of songs written and recorded by Russ Ballard 
The column Song list the song title; bold means released as a single.
The column Writer(s) lists who wrote the song.
The column Time shows its length.
The column Album lists the album the song is featured on.
The column Producer lists the producer of the song.
The column Year lists the year in which the song was released.

Russ Ballard songs covered by others

Songs written for Argent, The Roulettes and Unit 4 + 2

Songs written for others

As a Producer and Player

Songs

LP records

Portrait
In 1984 Mary Turner produced a 15-minute portrait of Russ Ballard as a record with the title "A Portrait Of An Artist By Mary Turner"

References 

Ballard, Russ